Gold is a greatest hits compilation album of Garnett Silk's songs released post-posthumously by Jet Star. Released in 2000, the album contains some of Silk's most well known songs including: "Hello Africa", "Mama", "Oh Me, Oh My" and "Jah, Jah is the Ruler".

Track listing

Reception
AllMusic gave the album a good review and 4.5 stars, stating:

References

Garnett Silk albums
2000 albums